Supreme Council of Cyberspace (Iran) is a cyberspace-council which was formed on 26 February 2012 by the decree of Iran's supreme leader, Seyyed Ali Khamenei; and is obliged to establish "National Cyberspace Center of the country" to have an entire and up-to-date knowledge of internal/external cyberspace and in order to decide regarding "how to deal with the harms of the Internet".

The members of this council are appointed for a period of 3 years; and the president of the country is considered as the head of it. The High-Council of Informatics, the High-Council of Information and the High-Council of IT are considered as the bodies which were acted as policy makers and implementers in the mentioned field before this council's formation.

Natural-members 
The "Supreme Council of Cyberspace" consists of the following "Natural-members":
 Saied Reza Ameli
 Hamid Shahriari
 Reza Taghipour
 Ezzatollah Zarghami
 Mohammad Sarafraz
 Mohammad Hassan Entezari
 Mahdi Akhavan Bahabadi
 Masoud Abu-Talebi
 Kamyar Saqafi
 Rasoul Jalili

Legal-members 
Legal-members of the "Supreme Council of Cyberspace" are as follows:
 Secretary of the Council and President of the National Cyberspace Center: Mohammad-Amin Aghamiri
 President of Iran: Ebrahim Raisi
 List of speakers of the Parliament of Iran: Mohammad Bagher Ghalibaf
 Head of Judicial system of Iran: Gholam-Hossein Mohseni-Eje'i
 Head of Islamic Republic of Iran Broadcasting: Peyman Jebelli 
 Minister of Ministry of Information and Communications Technology of Iran: Issa Zarepour
 Minister of Ministry of Culture and Islamic Guidance: Mohammad Mehdi Esmaili
 Minister of Ministry of Science, Research and Technology (Iran): Mohammad Ali Zolfigol
 Minister of Ministry of Education (Iran): Yousef Nouri
 Minister of Ministry of Intelligence (Iran): Esmaeil Khatib
 Minister of Ministry of Defence and Armed Forces Logistics (Iran): Mohammad-Reza Gharaei Ashtiani
 Vice President for Science and Technology: Rouhollah Dehghani Firouzabadi 
 Chairman of the Cultural Commission of the Islamic Consultative Assembly :Morteza Aghatehrani
 Head of Islamic Development Organization: Mohammad Qomi
 Commander of Islamic Revolutionary Guard Corps: Hossein Salami
 Commander of Law Enforcement Force of the Islamic Republic of Iran: Ahmad-Reza Radan
 Prosecutor-General of Iran: Mohammad Jafar Montazeri

See also 
 Supreme Leader Representation in Universities
 Hamid Shahriari

References

Organisations under control of the Supreme Leader of Iran
Organizations established in 2012
Islamic organisations based in Iran
Organisations based in Tehran
2012 establishments in Iran
Iranian entities subject to the U.S. Department of the Treasury sanctions
Specially Designated Nationals and Blocked Persons List